Saw Hardy (born 1916) was a Burmese boxer. He competed in the men's bantamweight event at the 1948 Summer Olympics.

References

External links
 

1916 births
Possibly living people
Burmese male boxers
Olympic boxers of Myanmar
Boxers at the 1948 Summer Olympics
Place of birth missing
Bantamweight boxers